The 2005 Beijing Guoan F.C. season was their 2nd consecutive season in the Chinese Super League, established  in the 2004, and 15th consecutive season in the top flight of Chinese football. They competed in the Chinese Super League, FA Cup and Super League Cup.

First team
As of July 15, 2005

Friendlies

Mid–season

Competitions

Chinese Super League

Matches

Chinese FA Cup

Chinese Super League Cup

References

Beijing Guoan F.C. seasons
Chinese football clubs 2005 season